Kon Hoeel Marathi Crorepati or Kon Honar Crorepati is an Indian game show presented in Marathi on ETV Marathi and later on Sony Marathi. It is the official Indian Marathi adaptation of the Sony Pictures, television-owned game show Who Wants to be a Millionaire? and its Hindi adaptation Kaun Banega Crorepati hosted by Amitabh Bachchan.

The Marathi version of this show will be featuring Marathi actor Sachin Khedekar as the anchor. The third season is being hosted by comedian Swapnil Joshi. Later the show mainly hosted by film director Nagraj Manjule, the season also introduced Karamveer special episodes about people who did extraordinary work in social sector in the show. First Karamveer is being called on show was Adhik Kadam who worked for the children of Jammu and Kashmir since 1997 and helping communities with emergency medical services by providing Ambulances, doctors, paramedics but mostly love and respect.

Format
Sachin Khedekar will ask a set of 15 questions, and the contestant who answers all of them correctly will be awarded a prize of ₹1,00,00,000 (1 crore).

The questions each have a time limit of 30 seconds, and each successive correct response increases the assigned prize in a way that the 15th correct response awards 1 crore rupees.

The game will have 3 lifelines, which are the following:
 50-50, where 2 incorrect options are removed
 Phone A Friend, where a friend will assist
 Audience Poll, where the audience will vote on the question asked to the contestant and select an option of their choice. The options with their corresponding votes will be graphically represented and the contestant will have to make a choice among those.

Selecting a wrong answer will lead to immediate termination and the contestant will have to leave with only the amount of prize assigned for the nearest 5th correct response (meaning if the contestant gets the 1st through 5th question wrong, he ends up with nothing, or if the contestant gets the 6th through 10th question wrong, then he ends up with only the prize for the 5th correct response, and so on and so forth so that if the contestant gets the 11th through 15th question wrong, then he ends up with only the prize for the 10th correct response).

That said, the contestant will have the power to quit at any moment of the show to receive the current prize and avoid risking loss of prize for all correct responses past the nearest 5th correct response.

Current Lifelines
 Audience Poll
 Video Call A Friend
 Flip The Question

Seasons
The award prize in Season 1 was Rs. 1 crore. In Season 2, the award prize was increased to Rs. 2 crores. Season 3 was hosted by Swapnil Joshi. The show started in May 2013 on ETV Marathi channel at 9 to 10.30 pm from Monday to Wednesday.

The 4th and 5th season aired on Sony Marathi. The 4th season was hosted by Director Nagraj Manjule. Season 1, 2 and 5 were hosted by Sachin Khedekar.

References

External links
 Kon Honar Crorepati on SonyLIV

Indian game shows
Marathi-language television shows
Who Wants to Be a Millionaire?
Colors Marathi original programming
Sony Marathi original programming